Rubus macrophyllus is a European species of bramble in the rose family. It can be found across Europe, from Ireland to Bulgaria. There are reports of the species having become naturalized in the States of Washington and Oregon in the northwestern United States.

The genetics of Rubus is extremely complex, so that it is difficult to decide on which groups should be recognized as species. There are many rare species with limited ranges such as this. Further study is suggested to clarify the taxonomy.

References

External links
 photo of herbarium specimen at Missouri Botanical Garden
 

macrophyllus
Plants described in 1822
Flora of Europe